Moseleya may refer to:
 Moseleya (cnidarian), a genus of cnidarians in the family Lobophylliidae
 Moseleya, a genus of plants in the family Plantaginaceae, synonym of Ellisiophyllum
 Moseleya, a genus of fishes in the family Macrouridae, synonym of Coryphaenoides